Arcadio González (born 30 November 1979) was a Paraguayan footballer who played in his country and Chile.

Honours

Club
Cobreloa
 Primera División de Chile (1): 2003 Clausura

External links
 

Living people
People from Capiatá
Paraguayan footballers
Paraguayan expatriate footballers
12 de Octubre Football Club players
Cobreloa footballers
Expatriate footballers in Chile
Association football central defenders
1979 births